Madrone is a neighborhood of Morgan Hill, California, located at the base of the Santa Cruz Mountains. Once an independent township within Santa Clara County, the City of Morgan Hill annexed the Town of Madrone in 1959, turning the town into Morgan Hill's northern district, bordering San Jose, California. Today, Madrone is primarily an affluent residential area, home to numerous luxury developments and landed estates.

With median home price of $1,422,346, Madrone is among the most expensive neighborhoods in United States, well above the national average of $220,100.

History

The area now known as Madrone had long been known as a popular campsite for Spanish colonists traveling between Monterey and San Jose. However, Madrone was first permanently settled in 1835, during the period of Mexican rule in California, by Juan María Hernández, who was granted the Rancho Refugio de la Laguna Seca. In 1845, the rancho came into the hands of Captain William Fisher, the first American citizen to own land in the area.

Soon after the 1850 American Conquest of California, the area was organized as the Burnett Township in 1852, named after Peter Hardeman Burnett, the first American Governor of California and local resident. By 1882, settlement came to be known as Madrone, after the Pacific Madrone, with the popularity of the local Madrone Mineral Springs.

The City of Morgan Hill annexed the Town of Madrone in 1959, rendering Madrone as a historic neighborhood of Morgan Hill.

Communities
Within Madrone, there are numerous distinct communities, including:
Amadora
Capriano
Madrone Plaza
Stonebridge
Willow Springs Canyon
Mission Ranch
Alicante
Borello Ranch Estates
Coyote Estates
Vista de Lomas

Economy

Madrone is home to a number of Silicon Valley tech companies, all housed within the Madrone Business Park, on Madrone Parkway. Some of these companies include:
 Paramit Corporation
 Harris Corporation
 NxEdge
 Amtech Microelectronics

Madrone is also home to numerous small businesses and community organizations, such as:
 Josephine Bakery, a high-end, specialty bakery housed in a historic Spanish Revival building.
 Edward Boss Prado Foundation, a Morgan Hill charitable foundation

Education
Madrone is served by the Morgan Hill Unified School District:
 Sobrato High School
 Central High School
 Morgan Hill Charter School

References

External links

Morgan Hill, California
Neighborhoods in California